Plaxomicrus nigriventris is a species of beetle in the family Cerambycidae. It was described by Pu in 1991.

References

Astathini
Beetles described in 1991